The Men's individual pursuit LC1 track cycling event at the 2008 Summer Paralympics was competed on 8 September. It was won by Michael Gallagher, representing .

Qualifying

8 September 2008, 09:30

Final round

8 September 2008, 15:20
Gold

Bronze

References

M